Vadakkumkur Rajarajavarmaraja (also written as Vadakkumkur Rajaraja Varma Raja)  (27 November 1891 - 28 February 1970) was a Sanskrit-Malayalam scholar from the Indian State of Kerala. He has written several great epics, short poems and deep interpretations, all based on stories appearing in classical Sanskrit puranic and other texts. He is known as a great poet, biographer, literary critic, researcher and also as a scientist.

He was born on 27 November 1891  as the son of Vaikom Vazhuthanakkattu Kottarathil Kavukkutty Thampuratty (mother) and Sukapuram Thottupurathu Purushothaman Achyuthan Nambuthiri (father). He had his early formal education in Govt School, Vaikom. He also studied Sanskrit in the traditional style at home. He was associated with the Tranvancore Manuscript Library in several capacities, was a member of Kochi Malayala Bhasha Parishkarana Committee and also has served Kerala Sahithya Academy as an Executive Committee Member. Among his several works, his interpretation of Krishnagatha had wide popularity among Malayalam speaking people.

Publications
The following is a partial list of books authored by Raja.

Śr̲imahābhārataṃ
Uḷḷūr mahākavi: paṭhanaṃ
Mahākavi Rāmapāṇivādan 
Kēral̥īyasaṃskr̥ta sāhityacaritraṃ 
Śailīpr̲adīpaṃ
Sāhityamañjūṣika
Mēpputtūr Nārāyaṇabhaṭṭatiri
Uttara Bhārataṃ : mahākāvyaṃ 
Rāmārjjunīyaṃ campu; savyākhyānaṃ
Śr̲ī Vālmīki
Sāhityamañjjuṣika
Rāmārjjunīyaṃ
Sāhitīsarvvasvaṃ : sāhityaśāstr̲agranthaṃ
Mahaccaramaṃ : oru vilāpakāvyaṃ
Sahithee Sarvaswam

See also
Vadakkumkur

References

Additional reading

Vadakkumkur Rajarajavarmaraja in Malayalam Wikipedia

Indian Sanskrit scholars
Malayalam-language writers
Poets from Kerala
20th-century Indian poets